Coleophora cyrta is a moth of the family Coleophoridae. It is found in Turkestan and Uzbekistan.

The wingspan is 14–15 mm.

The larvae feed on Salsola species, including Salsola orientalis. They create a silky case. The surface is rough, with minute transverse wrinkles. It has four to six uneven stripes of different lengths and widths and is covered with longitudinal wrinkles which extend along the case. The valve is three-sided and comparatively small. The length of the case is 9–10 mm and it is chocolate-brown in color. Larvae can be found from the end of September to October.

References

cyrta
Moths described in 1973
Moths of Asia